Roskilde Idrætspark is a Danish football stadium and the home ground of FC Roskilde. It has a capacity of 6,000 of which 512 are covered seating

The stadium has a record attendance of 5,342 spectators on 30 October 2014 for a match between FC Roskilde and F.C. Copenhagen in the third round of the 2014–15 Danish Cup.

See also
FC Roskilde
List of football stadiums in Denmark

External links
Roskilde Idrætspark at FC Roskilde 

Stadiums in Denmark
Football venues in Denmark
Buildings and structures in Roskilde Municipality
Roskilde